Margaret Nankabirwa (born 6 July 1987) is a Ugandan female badminton player.

Career
Nankabirwa started playing badminton in 2008, inspired by her mother. In 2010, she competed at the Commonwealth Games in New Delhi, India and defeated by Alex Bruce of Canada in the first round of women's singles event. In 2014, she competed in Glasgow, Scotland and defeated in first round in women's singles, doubles, and mixed doubles event.

Achievements

African Badminton Championships 
Women's Doubles

BWF International Challenge/Series 
Women's singles

Women's doubles

 BWF International Challenge tournament
 BWF International Series tournament
 BWF Future Series tournament

References

External links
 
 

1987 births
Living people
Sportspeople from Kampala
Ugandan female badminton players
Commonwealth Games competitors for Uganda
Badminton players at the 2010 Commonwealth Games
Badminton players at the 2014 Commonwealth Games